Major General Patrick Anthony John Cordingley,  (born 6 October 1944) is a retired British Army officer who commanded the 2nd Division from 1995 to 1996.

Military career
Cordingley was educated at Sherborne School and the Royal Military Academy Sandhurst (Intake 35), where he was Senior Under-Officer of Waterloo Company. He was commissioned into 5th Royal Inniskilling Dragoon Guards in June 1965. He was given command of the 7th Armoured Brigade (Desert Rats) in 1988 and, in 1991, led the brigade during the Gulf War. He became General Officer Commanding Eastern District in 1992, General Officer Commanding 2nd Division in 1995 and Senior British Loan Services Officer to Oman in 1996, before he retired in 2000.

Later life
In 1996 Cordingley published a book detailing his leading the troops into Iraq titled In The Eye of the Storm: Commanding 7th Armoured Brigade in the Gulf War, which rose to the top of the non-fictional best seller lists. He was opposed to the Iraq War and has frequently spoken out against it citing his concern that many thousands of civilians would die unnecessarily. Cordingley has also spoken out against Britain renewing its Trident nuclear deterrent.

Cordingley was appointed an Officer of the Order of the British Empire in the 2017 Birthday Honours for services to the National Memorial Arboretum.

References

 

|-

1944 births
Living people
British Army major generals
Companions of the Distinguished Service Order
British Army personnel of the Gulf War
Graduates of the Royal Military Academy Sandhurst
5th Royal Inniskilling Dragoon Guards officers
People educated at Sherborne School
Fellows of the Royal Geographical Society
Officers of the Order of the British Empire